Scott Daniel Servais; born June 4, 1967) is an American professional baseball manager and former player who currently manages the Seattle Mariners.  

He played in the National League for the Houston Astros, Chicago Cubs, San Francisco Giants, and Colorado Rockies.

Early years
A native of Coon Valley, Wisconsin, Servais played high school baseball for the Westby Norsemen, and was selected in the second round of the 1985 amateur draft by the New York Mets, but did not sign. He opted to attend Creighton University in Omaha, Nebraska, and played college baseball for the Creighton Bluejays. In 1986, he played collegiate summer baseball with the Orleans Cardinals of the Cape Cod Baseball League. After his junior season, Servais was taken in the third round of the 1988 amateur draft by the Houston Astros.

National teams
Servais was a member of the United States national baseball team while the team competed in the last Amateur World Series before it was renamed the Baseball World Cup in 1986.  Following the Amateur World Series, he played in the 1987 Pan American Games, where they won the silver medal and the 1987 Intercontinental Cup.  Servais was also the back-up catcher for Doug Robbins at the 1988 Olympics in Seoul, where the U.S. won the gold medal, although baseball was only a demonstration event.

Playing career 
Servais began his major league career in 1991 with the Houston Astros, staying with them until the middle of the 1995 season when he was traded along with Luis Gonzalez to the Chicago Cubs for Rick Wilkins.  It was with the Cubs, during the 1998 season, that he played in his only post-season.  After the Cubs lost to the Braves in the National League Division Series as a wildcard team, he signed as a free agent with the San Francisco Giants.

Towards the end of the 2000 season, Servais was selected off waivers by the Colorado Rockies.  Prior to the 2001 season, he was picked up as a free agent by the Detroit Tigers, but was released before the season began. Shortly before the 2001 season, Servais was picked up as a free agent by the Houston Astros.  Servais was initially signed as a free agent prior to the 2002 season, but he did not make the opening day roster, making the 2001 season his final season.

Post-playing career

Texas Rangers and Los Angeles Angels of Anaheim
Servais served in the Texas Rangers' front office as the senior director of player development from 2004 until 2010. He was hired by Los Angeles Angels of Anaheim general manager Jerry Dipoto as assistant general manager in 2011. Dipoto and Servais are close friends, a relationship formed while playing together for the Colorado Rockies in 2000, when the pair had discussed Servais' dream of one day serving as a manager.

Seattle Mariners

When Dipoto resigned during the 2015 season, the Angels hired Billy Eppler. Dipoto was soon hired as the general manager of the Seattle Mariners on September 28, 2015, and second-year manager Lloyd McClendon was fired on October 9, less than a week after the season's conclusion. Two weeks later, Servais was hired as the manager of the Mariners for the 2016 season. 

On June 26, 2016, Servais received his first ejection as a manager, asking home plate umpire Carlos Torres why he didn't ask the first or third base umpire to see if Shawn O'Malley went around on his swing or not.  He finished his first season with a record of 86 wins and 76 losses. 

Servais received his second ejection as a manager on April 16, 2017 after first base umpire C. B. Bucknor originally called Leonys Martín's grounder a foul ball and changed the ruling after Rangers first baseman Mike Napoli pleaded with Bucknor that it was a fair ball and Rangers manager Jeff Banister was on his way out to plead his case. On May 25, 2017, Servais received his third ejection of his managerial career on a questionable strike three call on Guillermo Heredia in the top of the sixth inning against the Nationals.   His second season concluded six games under .500, a record of 84 losses vs 78 wins, achieving 3rd place in the American League Western Division.

On July 20, 2018, Jerry Dipoto announced that Servais' contract would be extended for an undisclosed salary and number of years. This extension came when the 2018 Mariners were playing 58-39, the fourth-best record in the MLB. The team would falter after the all-star break and finished the season in third place in the AL West, 14 games behind the first-place Houston Astros, and 8 games out of the wild card playoff game. 

Following the 2018 season, Dipoto was given clearance to trade away the team's best players in order to rebuild towards future strength. In kind, the 2019 Mariners finished 68-94 after a blistering, franchise-best 13-2 start. The 2020 season was a development of the future crop of players, with a better result at 27-33. Through the 2019 and 2020 season, rumors circulated about Servais' long-term career stability with the Mariners, although Dipoto and other front office staff have only voiced confidence.

In 2021, Servais led the Mariners to their best season since 2003, finishing with a 90–72 record and two games back in the American League Wild Card race. The Mariners won despite a run differential of -51, the worst ever for a team with at least 90 wins; on the final day of the season, needing a win to possibly force a tie for the Wild Card, the Mariners lost to the Angels.  Servais placed second in voting for the American League Manager of the Year Award, behind Kevin Cash of the Tampa Bay Rays.

On September 1, 2021 the Mariners announced that Servais had agreed to a multi-year extension with the club.

In 2022, Servais's Mariners had high expectations, but stumbled to a 29-39 record in the first 68 games of the season. However, the Mariners recovered and made the 2022 MLB playoffs as a wild card team. With this playoff appearance, Servais became only the second manager in Seattle Mariners history to lead the team to the playoffs. 

The Mariners faced the Toronto Blue Jays in the 2022 American League Wild Card Series. They won the series in two games, clinching their first playoff series win in 21 years, with the team coming back from an 8-1 deficit after the first five innings to win 10-9, the second largest comeback in postseason history. 

In the 2022 American League Division Series, they faced the Houston Astros, who had beaten them 12 out of 19 times in AL West matchups. In Game 1, they scored four runs in the first two innings and held the lead to 7-3 going into the eighth inning. However, the bullpen could not hold it together, and the lead was only 7-5 going into the 9th; Paul Sewald allowed two baserunners (a hit by pitch and a single by Jeremy Pena) to reach while only getting two outs. Servais elected to use Robbie Ray to try and get Yordan Alvarez out to end the game. The gambit failed, as Alvarez launched Ray's second pitch into deep right field for a walkoff 8-7 win. Two days later, the Mariners held a 2-1 lead going into the 6th inning. Again, with two outs and Pena on base, Alvarez was at the plate, this time against starter Luis Castillo. Alvarez launched a home run to left field to give Houston a 3-2 lead. In the 8th, Alvarez was intentionally walked by Servais to get to Alex Bregman with a runner on. Bregman promptly lined a shot to right to make the final score 4-2. Two days after that, the Mariners played their first home playoff game in 21 years. 18 innings later, they lost 1-0 on a Pena home run to finish their season. In total, Seattle was outscored 10-2 over the next 29 innings after leading 7-5 in the 7th inning of Game 1.

Managerial record

Personal life
Servais is the nephew of Creighton head baseball coach Ed Servais.  Scott is married to Jill (Hanson), his high school sweetheart. The couple have a son and two daughters.

References

External links

Scott Servais Seattle Mariners profile
Venezuelan Winter League

1967 births
Living people
Baseball players at the 1987 Pan American Games
Baseball players at the 1988 Summer Olympics
Baseball players from Wisconsin
Chicago Cubs players
Colorado Rockies players
Colorado Springs Sky Sox players
Columbus Mudcats players
Creighton Bluejays baseball players
Fresno Grizzlies players
Houston Astros players
Los Angeles Angels of Anaheim executives
Major League Baseball catchers
Medalists at the 1988 Summer Olympics
Navegantes del Magallanes players
American expatriate baseball players in Venezuela
New Orleans Zephyrs players
Olympic gold medalists for the United States in baseball
Orleans Firebirds players
Osceola Astros players
Pan American Games medalists in baseball
Pan American Games silver medalists for the United States
Sportspeople from La Crosse, Wisconsin
People from Vernon County, Wisconsin
San Francisco Giants players
Seattle Mariners managers
Texas Rangers personnel
Tucson Toros players
Medalists at the 1987 Pan American Games